Saptamukhi River is a tidal estuarine river in and around the Sundarbans in South 24 Parganas district in the Indian state of West Bengal.

The Saptamukhi originates near Sultanpur and flows between Kulpi and Mathurapur blocks. It has a connection with the Muri Ganga River and Deogra Khal.

References

Rivers of West Bengal
Geography of South 24 Parganas district
Sundarbans
Rivers of India